Chrissie Maher  (born 1938) co-founded Plain English Campaign, a company that promotes the clear use of English, particularly by businesses and official bodies. Chrissie was inspired both by the need for democratic language (information that could be understood by adults of all educational levels) and plain language champions such as Sir Ernest Gowers and George Orwell.

Early campaigns
In 1971 Maher founded the UK's first community newspaper, the Tuebrook Bugle, which gave her the chance to write articles demanding that organisations start using plain English. In 1974 Maher started The Liverpool News, the UK's first newspaper for adults with reading difficulties. Many of the plain English principles that would eventually inspire the Plain English Campaign were put into early action with both The Tuebrook Bugle and The Liverpool News. Chrissie was also a member of the UK's National Consumer Council.

Plain English Campaign
Maher officially launched Plain English Campaign at a demonstration in London in 1979.
In 1994, as an example of the linguistic issues she found objectionable, Maher pointed out that Britain's National Health Service published a definition of the term bed that used 229 words.
Tom McArthur, editor of the Oxford Companion to the English Language said, "In all the history of the language, there has never been such a powerful grassroots movement to influence it as the Plain English Campaign."

Awards & honours
 1993 Order of the British Empire.
 1995 Manchester University honorary MA degree. 
 1997 Open University honorary doctorate. 
 2000 Maher, disability rights campaigner Lord Alfred Morris of Manchester, and World Wide Web creator Tim Berners-Lee were named "Information Pioneers of the Century" by the UK's National Information Forum.
 2010 Liverpool John Moores University Honorary Fellowship for services to communication.
 2010 Public Affairs Achiever of the Year and Outstanding Achiever of the Year from the 'Women in Public Life' awards.

See also
 Simple English Wikipedia
 Golden Bull Award

References

External links
 Plain English Campaign Homepage

1938 births
Officers of the Order of the British Empire
Plain English
Living people
People from Tuebrook